Jiang Chaoliang (born 1 August 1957) is a Chinese politician and investor. In the past, he has served as the governor of Jilin province in Northeast China, and an executive at China Development Bank and the Agricultural Bank of China. Jiang is also an member of the 19th Central Committee of the Chinese Communist Party. In February 2020, he was dismissed as the Communist Party Secretary of Hubei.

Career
Jiang graduated with a master's degree in Economics from Southwestern University of Finance and Economics and is a senior economist. His first position upon graduation was as director of the Shenzhen Division of the State Administration of Foreign Exchange. He then served in the same capacity within the Guangdong Division. In June 2000 he served as an assistant to the Governor of the People's Bank of China, working under Dai Xianglong.

In September 2002, he entered politics, and was named the vice governor of Hubei. In June 2004, he became a non-executive director and Chairman of the Board of the Bank of Communications. In September 2008 he became President and Vice Chairman of the China Development Bank. In January 2012, Chairman and Chairman of Strategic Planning Committee of the Agricultural Bank of China.

Jiang was credited with transforming the Bank of Communications into a dual-listed company with HSBC Holdings and as acting as its strategic investor and partner.

In September 2014, Jiang was appointed acting governor of Jilin province, succeeding Bayanqolu, who had been appointed Communist Party Secretary of the province. He was confirmed as Governor by the provincial People's Congress on October 29, 2014. During his term in Jilin, the province's GDP growth figures peaked above the national average. Jiang was appointed party secretary of Hubei in October 2016. On February 12, 2020, Jiang was removed from his post as Party secretary of Hubei as a result of his handling of the COVID-19 pandemic, and was replaced by Ying Yong, mayor of Shanghai and a close ally of General Secretary of the Chinese Communist Party Xi Jinping.

On March 5, 2020, Jiang has resigned as chairman of the Standing Committee of the Hubei People's Congress at the 15th session of the 13th Hubei People's Congress.

On August 20, 2021, he was appointed vice chairperson of the National People's Congress Agriculture and Rural Affairs Committee.

He is also an adviser to the China Finance 40 Forum (CF40).

References

Chinese bankers
Political office-holders in Hubei
Living people
1957 births
Governors of Jilin
Chinese Communist Party politicians from Hunan
People's Republic of China politicians from Hunan
Politicians from Yueyang
Southwestern University of Finance and Economics alumni
Agricultural Bank of China people
Bank of Communications people
China Development Bank people
Alternate members of the 18th Central Committee of the Chinese Communist Party
Members of the 19th Central Committee of the Chinese Communist Party
Members of the 11th Chinese People's Political Consultative Conference
Delegates to the 13th National People's Congress
Delegates to the 12th National People's Congress